Frank Williams may refer to:

Arts and entertainment
Frank D. Williams (cinematographer) (1893–1961), American cinematographer
Francis William Sullivan (penname "Frank Williams", fl. 1910s), American novelist
Frank Williams (actor) (1931–2022), British actor
Franklin Delano Williams (1947–1993), American Gospel music singer

Politics and law
F. A. Williams (1851–1945), American jurist, Justice of the Supreme Court of Texas
Frank J. Williams (born 1940), American jurist, Chief Justice of the Rhode Island Supreme Court
Frank Williams (politician) (born 1942), American politician in the state of Florida
Frank D. Williams (Michigan), state legislator in Michigan

Sports

Association football
Frank Williams (footballer, born 1906) (1906–1982), Welsh football player
Frank Williams (footballer, born 1908) (1908–?), English football player and manager
Frank Williams (footballer, born 1917) (1917–1978), Welsh football player
Frank Williams (footballer, born 1921) (1921–1999), English football player

Australian rules football
Frank Williams (Australian footballer, born 1884) (1884–1939), Australian rules footballer for St Kilda
Frank Williams (Australian footballer, born 1888) (1888–1959), Australian rules footballer for Carlton
Frank Williams (Australian footballer, born 1914) (1914–2005), Australian rules footballer for Carlton and Melbourne

Rugby
Frank Williams (rugby, fl. 1910s), Welsh rugby union and rugby league footballer of the 1910s
Frank Williams (English rugby league) (born c. 1910), English rugby league footballer of the 1930s for England and Warrington
Frank Williams (rugby union, born 1910) (1910–1959), Welsh international rugby union player

Other sports
Frank Williams (cricketer) (1876–1946), New Zealand cricketer
Frank Williams (outfielder) (1918–1987), American baseball player
Frank Williams (gridiron football) (1932–2006), American gridiron football player
Frank Williams (Formula One) (1942–2021), British founder and manager of the Williams Formula One team
Frank Williams (pitcher) (1958–2009), American baseball player
Frank Williams (cyclist) (born 1964), Sierra Leonean cyclist
Frank Williams (basketball) (born 1980), American professional basketball player
Frankie Williams (American football) (born 1993), American football player

Others
Frank Williams (Medal of Honor) (1872–1900), American sailor in the Spanish–American War
Frank M. Williams (1873–1930), American engineer and surveyor
Francis Williams, Baron Francis-Williams (Frank Williams, 1903–1970), British newspaper editor
Frank Williams (architect) (1936–2010), American architect
Frank Abagnale (alias Frank Williams, born 1948), American impostor and forger

See also
Francis Williams (disambiguation)
Frank Williams Racing Cars, a British Formula One team and constructor
Franklin Williams (disambiguation)